Morden Road railway station was a station in Merton, on the West Croydon to Wimbledon Line.

History 

The West Croydon to Wimbledon Line was opened on 22 October 1855, and the station opened on the same day or 1857, originally being named Morden. It was renamed three times: to Morden Halt in 1910; to Morden Road Halt on 2 July 1951, and finally to Morden Road on 5 May 1969. The last train ran on 31 May 1997 when the line was closed. Shortly after closure the original platform was demolished and the two-platform Morden Road tram stop of the Tramlink system was built on the site.

References

See also 
List of closed railway stations in London

Disused railway stations in the London Borough of Merton
Former London, Brighton and South Coast Railway stations
Railway stations in Great Britain opened in 1857
Railway stations in Great Britain closed in 1997
1857 establishments in England